Kosmos 31 ( meaning Cosmos 31), also known as DS-MT No.2 was a technology demonstration satellite which was launched by the Soviet Union in 1964 as part of the Dnepropetrovsk Sputnik programme. Its primary mission was to demonstrate an electric gyrodyne orientation system. It also carried a scientific research package as a secondary payload, which was used to study cosmic rays.

It was launched aboard a Kosmos-2I 63S1 rocket from Mayak-2 at Kapustin Yar. The launch occurred at 06:00 GMT on 6 June 1964.

It decayed from orbit on 20 October 1964. Kosmos 31 was the second of three DS-MT satellites to be launched. The first, DS-MT No.1, was lost in a launch failure on 1 June 1963, and the third will be Kosmos 51, which will be launched on 9 December 1964.

See also

 1964 in spaceflight

References

Spacecraft launched in 1964
Kosmos 0031
1964 in the Soviet Union
Spacecraft which reentered in 1964
1964 in spaceflight
Dnepropetrovsk Sputnik program